The 2012–13 Quaid-e-Azam Trophy was one of two first-class domestic cricket competitions that were held in Pakistan during the 2012–13 season. It was the 55th edition of the Quaid-e-Azam Trophy, and was contested by fourteen teams representing regional cricket associations. It was preceded in the schedule by the President's Trophy, which was contested by ten departmental teams.

The Pakistan Cricket Board made substantial changes to the structure of domestic first-class cricket for the 2012–13 season. Having competed together for the previous five seasons, the regional associations and departments were separated into their own competitions. The format of the Quaid-e-Azam Trophy was also changed, with two round-robin group stages and a final between the top sides in the "Super-Eight" to determine the winner.

Karachi Blues won the Quaid-e-Azam Trophy for the ninth time, and the twentieth by a Karachi team, beating Sialkot by nine wickets in the final.

Structure and format
The Pakistan Cricket Board made substantial changes to the structure of domestic first-class cricket for the 2012–13 season. Having competed together for the previous five seasons, the regional associations and departments were separated into their own competitions. The regions remained in the Quaid-e-Azam Trophy and the departments were moved into a new President's Trophy competition. The format of the Quaid-e-Azam Trophy was also changed, with two round-robin group stages and a final between the top sides in the "Super-Eight" to determine the winner.

With the absence of departments from the competition, teams were permitted to recruit five departmental players to their squads, of which four could be named for any given match. Kookaburra cricket balls, commonly used in international cricket, were also introduced.

The fourteen teams, the thirteen who competed in 2011–12 plus Bahawalpur, were divided between two groups in the first stage of the competition. The top four teams from each group proceeded to the Super-Eight in the second stage, while the remaining six teams proceeded to the Plate-League. In both the Super-Eight and the Plate-League, the teams were split into two groups based on ranking in the first stage, with the top team in each second stage group contesting a final.

Standings and points
Positions in the tables were determined by total points, most matches won, fewest matches lost, followed by adjusted net run rate (matches with no result, i.e. those where both teams did not complete their first innings, were disregarded); matches finishing in a draw were decided on first innings scores, with points awarded as follows:
Win having led on first innings = 9 points
Win having tied or trailed on first innings = 6 points
Tie having led on first innings = 5 points
Draw having led on first innings = 3 points
Draw having tied on first innings, or tie having trailed on first innings = 2 points
Loss, draw having trailed or with no result on first innings, or abandoned without a ball bowled = 0 points

Team locations

Group stage

Tables

Results

Group I
Source:Cricinfo

Group II
Source:Cricinfo

Bottom six stage

Tables

Results

Pool A
Source:Cricinfo

Pool B
Source:Cricinfo

Final

Super-Eight stage

Tables

Results

Group A
Source:Cricinfo

Group B
Source:Cricinfo

Final

Statistics

Most runs

Last updated 22 February 2013

Highest scores

Last updated 22 February 2013

Most wickets

Last updated 22 February 2013

Best bowling

Last updated 22 February 2013

 Wahab Riaz from Lahore Shalimar took a hat-trick against Lahore Ravi with the wickets of Abid Ali, Ahmed Shehzad and Adnan Akmal

Notes

References

External links
 Quaid-e-Azam Trophy 2012–13 – Official
 Quaid-e-Azam Trophy 2012–13 – ESPNcricinfo
Quaid-e-Azam Trophy 2012–13 – CricketArchive

Domestic cricket competitions in 2012–13
2012 in Pakistani cricket
2013 in Pakistani cricket
2012-13 Quaid-e-Azam Trophy
Pakistani cricket seasons from 2000–01